Tagirkent is a rural locality (a selo) in Magaramkentsky Selsoviet, Magaramkentsky District, Republic of Dagestan, Russia. The population was 360 as of 2010. There are 6 streets.

Geography 
Tagirkent is located 102 km south of Makhachkala. Tagzirkent and Susakent are the nearest rural localities.

Nationalities 
Lezgins live there.

References 

Rural localities in Magaramkentsky District